Major General Wendell L. Griffin, USAF, is a retired American Air Force officer who served as the Chief of Safety of the United States Air Force from 2007 to 2009.

Maj. Gen. Griffin is rated Command pilot with 4,200 flight hours minimum flying time.

Awards and recognition 
His awards and decorations include the Air Force Distinguished Service Medal, the Defense Superior Service Medal with oak leaf cluster and the Legion of Merit with oak leaf cluster. They also include the Bronze Star Medal, the Air Medal, Air Force Commendation Medal, Air Force Achievement Medal, the Air Force Outstanding Unit Award with "V" device and four oak leaf clusters, the Air Force Organizational Excellence Award with four oak leaf clusters, the Combat Readiness Medal with two oak leaf clusters, the National Defense Service Medal with bronze star, the Global War on Terrorism Expeditionary Medal and the Global War on Terrorism Service Medal.

External links
www.af.mil Official USAF biography about Maj. Gen. Wendell L. Griffin

References

Recipients of the Legion of Merit
Recipients of the Air Force Distinguished Service Medal
Living people
Recipients of the Defense Superior Service Medal
Year of birth missing (living people)